Zübeyir Aydar (born 1961, in Eruh) is a Kurdish politician, lawyer and president of the Kongra-Gel (People's Congress of Kurdistan), which is the parliament of the Koma Civakên Kurdistan (KCK), making him the de jure political leader of the outlawed Kurdistan Workers' Party (PKK).

Biography
Born in Yanıkses village in the Eruh District of Siirt Province, he graduated from the Law Faculty of Istanbul University after which he worked as a lawyer in Siirt from 1986 to 1991. There he organized the local branch of the Turkish Human Rights Association (IHD) and joined the first Kurdish party in Turkey, the People's Labor Party (HEP). He was elected to the Grand National Assembly of Turkey in 1991 on a ticket with the Social Democratic Populist Party for the Siirt province. When HEP was banned in 1993, he joined the new Kurdish party, the Democracy Party (DEP). When DEP was banned in 1994, Aydar fled to Belgium as most party members were arrested by Turkish authorities. He has been living in Brussels since then. In Europe he joined the Kurdistan Parliament in Exile (PKDW) and later the Kurdistan National Congress (KNK) and Kurdistan Union of Communities (KCK), where he became head of the legislature in 2003.

He is wanted in Turkey for being "member of an illegal political party" and since October 14, 2009 wanted by the U.S. for alleged "narcotics trafficking", along with Murat Karayılan and Ali Riza Altun.

In June 2010, Belgian authorities arrested Aydar along with Remzi Kartal, Adem Uzun and Faruk Doru for involvement with financial transactions to PKK accounts. Several academic and political figures in Europe protested the arrest as counter-productive to finding a political solution for the Kurdish movement. After three weeks, Aydar and his co-defendants were released on lack of evidence.

References

1961 births
Turkish Kurdish people
Turkish Kurdish politicians
Living people
Istanbul University Faculty of Law alumni
Democracy Party (Turkey) politicians
Exiled Turkish politicians
People from Siirt Province